Szymon Skrzypczak (born 14 March 1990) is a Polish professional footballer who plays as a centre forward for Chojniczanka Chojnice.

Club career
In 2017, he moved to Odra Opole.

On 18 August 2020, he signed a two-year contract with Chojniczanka Chojnice.

References

External links
 
 

1990 births
People from Rawicz
Sportspeople from Greater Poland Voivodeship
Living people
Polish footballers
Association football forwards
Ruch Radzionków players
MKS Kluczbork players
KS Polkowice players
Górnik Zabrze players
GKS Katowice players
Odra Opole players
Chojniczanka Chojnice players
Ekstraklasa players
I liga players
II liga players
III liga players